The siege of Laghouat was an episode of the French Pacification of Algeria. General Aimable Pélissier commanding an army of 6,000, besieged the city of Laghouat from November 21st until December 4, 1852 when the city capitulated.  The brutal treatment of the inhabitants was part of the scorched earth tactic of the French army and one of the first instances of recorded use of chemical weapon on civilians.

The storming of Laghouat turned quickly into several days of massacres to punish the population that was treated as combating enemies. The battle also witness the several deaths on the French side including that of general Bouscaren, that added to the fervor of the French soldiers to want to take revenge on the population setting an example for other towns and cities throughout the south of Algeria. About two thirds (2,500 to 3,000 out of a total of 4,500 inhabitants remaining in the besieged city) including women and children were massacred..

The massacre left a deep trauma in the Laghouati population that endure today. The year of the "Khalya" Arabic for emptiness is commonly known to the inhabitants of Laghouat as the year, when the city was emptied of its population. It is also commonly known as the year of Hessian sacks, referring to the way the captured surviving men and boys were put alive in the hessian sacks and thrown into dug up trenches. Many reports of the battle were written by army chiefs and soldiers as well as visitors of the city after the massacre that reported the morbid atmosphere of the city following the siege.
 
Surviving women were so afraid for their young sons of being collected by the French forces that they came up with a ruse to hide them. They dressed them as girls and put an earring  on one ear. The tradition of protecting young boys from evil with an earring has survived until today.

The level of brutality of the massacre of Laghouat was both a show of force as well as part of the long scorched earth tactic of the three French generals that took the fortified city. By ordering the massacre of the population, the French were eyeing all the remaining Saharian territories beyond Laghouat. During the battle of Laghouat several tribes and other city republics and fortresses delivered help to try to stop the advance of the French, namely Ghardaïa (and therefore the whole of the Mozabite confederation), Metlili, and Ouargla. The nobles of the latter cities, after witnessing or hearing of the atrocities committed in Laghouat, quickly sought a peaceful agreement to surrender their cities or sign treaties keeping their autonomy within the protection of France.

A few months after Laghouat, on April, 29th 1853, general Randon, the French governor of Algeria, signed a treaty of protectorate with the nobles of the cities of M'zab, known in France as the capitulation of the Mzab.

References

1852 in Algeria
Battles involving Algeria
Conflicts in 1852
December 1852 events
Massacres committed by France
November 1852 events
Sieges involving France